Pesquera is a town in the Ribera del Duero region that is noted for its red wine, balanced and fruity. It had a population of 562 at the 2001 census.

Municipalities in the Province of Valladolid